Olearia orientalis is a species of flowering plant in the family Asteraceae and is endemic to central eastern Queensland. It is a bushy shrub with egg-shaped leaves, the narrower end towards the base, and white and yellow daisy flowers.

Description

Taxonomy and naming
Olearia orientalis was first formally described in 2017 by Anthony Bean and Peter Craig Jobson in the journal Austrobaileya from specimens collected in the Port Curtis district in 1994. The specific epithet (orientalis) means "eastern", referring to the distribution of this species.

Distribution and habitat
This olearia grows in woodland on serpentinite hills and ridges near Rockhampton in eastern Queensland.

Conservation status
Olearia orietalis is listed as "endangered" under the Queensland Government Nature Conservation Act 1992.

References

orientalis
Flora of Queensland
Plants described in 2017